Angela (stylized in lowercase) is a Japanese band, notable for having their music portrayed as theme songs for several anime television shows. The main members are Atsuko and Katsu. Their signature upbeat tunes and rich arrangements combine elements of rock, electronica, jazz and ska. In 2008, they started an alter ego band called Domestic Love Band (ドメスティック・ラヴバンド). They are most well known for providing all opening and ending themes to the Fafner in the Azure anime series.

History
Although both Atsuko and Katsu were born in Okayama Prefecture, they met for the first time in Tokyo at a music school. In 1993 angela was formed and they began as street performers.  In 1999 they made their debut with the single memories, however this release went largely unnoticed. However, in 2002 angela signed on with Starchild. Their breakthrough came when they wrote the opening song, "Asu e no brilliant road" (明日へのbrilliant road), along with three different ending themes for the anime Stellvia of the Universe. Their first album, Sora no Koe (ソラノコエ) was released by Starchild in 2003. Since then they have provided songs for the show Fafner in the Azure and have released eight more studio albums: I/O in 2004, PRHYTHM in 2006, Land Ho! in 2009, mirror☆ge in 2011, ZERO in 2013, ONE WAY in 2015, LOVE & CARNIVAL in 2016, and Beyond in 2017; as well as two best-of compilations: Takarabako -Treasure Box- (宝箱 - Treasure Box) in 2007, and Takarabako 2 -Treasure Box II- (宝箱2 -Treasure Box II-) in 2014.

In 2004, angela played at the Otakon Convention in Baltimore, Maryland. The following year, 2005, saw live performances at Sakura-Con in Seattle, Washington, and also at Fan Expo Canada (known at the time as CN Anime) in Toronto, Ontario, Canada.

Sora no Koe was released in the United States by the Geneon label as Voice of the Sky in January 2005. Their second album I/O was released under the Geneon label in the U.S. in August 2005. Their next album, PRHYTHM, was released by Geneon in the U.S. in November 2006.

In 2010, for the first time, angela performed at Southeast Asia's largest anime convention, Anime Festival Asia (AFA), held annually in Singapore. It is also their first time performing in the country.
In 2011, they followed up with another performance organised by jplex in Singapore at Republic Polytechnic. In the same year, they appeared in Singapore again at Anime Festival Asia 2011. In 2012, they were invited for the third time to perform at Anime Festival Asia 2012 in Indonesia. The following year in 2013, they would return to perform in Singapore at Anime Festival Asia 2013. In 2018, they were invited for the fifth time to perform in Singapore at Anime Festival Asia 2018.

In July 2013, Angela performed for the first time in Paris, France at the Japanese culture convention, Japan Expo. On 31 October 2013, angela launched their official YouTube channel. They would make an appearance at the Anime Expo anime convention in Los Angeles in July 2014. 19th September 2015 Angela performed their first concert in Germany at the anime convention Connichi in Kassel. In 2017, their song  was used as the opening theme to the anime series Aho-Girl.

Members

Main
 atsuko
Full name: 
Born: January 23, 1975
Origin: Okayama Prefecture
In charge of: Vocals, lyrics and composition
 KATSU
Full name: 
Born: June 12, 1974
Origin: Okayama Prefecture
In charge of: Composition, arrangement, keyboard, guitar, bass drum, sanshin and DJ

Support
 
Full name: 
Born: April 8
In charge of: Drums
 
Full name: 
Born: December 2
In charge of: Bass guitar
 kanaco
Full name: 
Born: June 18
In charge of: Violin
 
In charge of: trombone
 
In charge of: trumpet
 
In charge of: Saxophone

Discography

Singles

Physical Singles
 明日へのbrilliant road (Asu e no brilliant road)
 Release date: 21 May 2003
 明日へのbrilliant road (Asu e no brilliant road)
 綺麗な夜空 (Kirei na Yozora)
 明日へのbrilliant road (off vocal version)
 綺麗な夜空 (off vocal version)
 The end of the world
 Release date: 21 August 2003
 The end of the world
 明日へのbrilliant road ～second genesis～ (Asu e no brilliant road ~second genesis~)
 The end of the world (off vocal version)
 明日へのbrilliant road ～second genesis～ (off vocal version)
 merry-go-round
 Release date: 3 December 2003
 merry-go-round
 butterfly
 merry-go-round (off vocal version)
 butterfly (off vocal version)
 fly me to the sky
 Release date: 26 May 2004
 fly me to the sky
 Proof
 fly me to the sky (off vocal version)
 Proof (off vocal version)
 in your arms
 Release date: 2 June 2004
 in your arms
 solitude
 in your arms (off vocal version)
 solitude (off vocal version)
 Shangri-La
 Release date: 4 August 2004
 Shangri-La
 Separation
 Shangri-La (off vocal version)
 Separation (off vocal version)
 未来とゆう名の答え (Mirai to Yuu Na no Kotae)
 Release date: 26 January 2005
 未来とゆう名の答え (Mirai to Yuu Na no Kotae)
 年下未知数脳内HD (Toshishita Michisuu Nounai HD)
 未来とゆう名の答え (off vocal version)
 年下未知数脳内HD (off vocal version)
 DEAD SET
 Release date: 3 August 2005
 DEAD SET
 花のように (Hana no You ni)
 DEAD SET (off vocal version)
 花のように (off vocal version)
 YOU GET TO BURNING
 Release date: 7 September 2005
 YOU GET TO BURNING
 Dearest
 YOU GET TO BURNING (off vocal version)
 Dearest (off vocal version)
 Peace of mind
 Release date: 21 December 2005
 Peace of mind
 砂の城 (Suna no Shiro)
 Peace of mind (off vocal version)
 砂の城 (off vocal version)
 gravitation
 Release date: 9 May 2007
 gravitation
 虚無の嵐 (Kyomu no Arashi)
 Your breath
 gravitation (off vocal version)
 虚無の嵐 (off vocal version)
 Your breath (off vocal version)
 Beautiful fighter
 Release date: 12 November 2008
 Beautiful fighter
 My story
 Darling
 Beautiful fighter (off vocal version)
 My story (off vocal version)
 Darling (off vocal version)
 約束 (Yakusoku)
 Release date: 25 December 2008
 約束 (Yakusoku)
 innocence
 Shangri-La
 約束 (off vocal version)
 innocence (off vocal version)
 Shangri-La (off vocal version)
 Spiral
 Release date: 13 May 2009
 Spiral
 Link
 Spiral (off vocal version)
 Link (off vocal version)
 オルタナティヴ (Alternative)
 Release date: 18 November 2009
 オルタナティヴ (Alternative)
 彼方のdelight (Kanata no delight)
 オルタナティヴ (off vocal version)　　　　　　　　　　　　　　　
 彼方のdelight (off vocal version)
 蒼い春 (Aoi Haru)
 Release date: 28 July 2010
 蒼い春 (Aoi Haru)　
 ツナガル→ム (Tsunaga Room)
 蒼い春 (off vocal version)　　　　　　　　　　　　　　　
 ツナガル→ム (off vocal version)
 蒼穹 (Soukyuu)
 Release date: 22 December 2010
 蒼穹 (Soukyuu)　
 さよならの時くらい微笑んで  (Sayonara no Toki Kurai Hohoen de)
 蒼穹 (off vocal version)　　　　　　　　　　　　　　　
 さよならの時くらい微笑んで (off vocal version)
 THE LIGHTS OF HEROES
 Release date: 25 January 2012
 THE LIGHTS OF HEROES　
 Shangri-La (mf)
 So sweet memories　　　　　　　　　　　　　　
 THE LIGHTS OF HEROES (off vocal version)
 Shangri-La (mf) (off vocal version)　　　　　　　　　　　　　　　
 So sweet memories (off vocal version)
 KINGS
 Release date: 24 October 2012
 KINGS
 THE DARK　　　　　　　　　　　　
 KINGS (off vocal version)
 THE DARK (off vocal version)
 ANGEL / 遠くまで (Tookumade)
 Release date: 6 November 2013
 ANGEL
 遠くまで (Tookumade)
 ANGEL (off vocal version)
 Tookumade (off vocal version)
 シドニア (Sidonia)
 Release date: 21 May 2014
 シドニア (Sidonia)
 My Life
 シドニア (off vocal version)
 My Life (off vocal version)
 Different colors
 Release date: 12 July 2014
 Different colors
 冷たい部屋、一人 (Tsumetai Heya, Hitori)
 Different colors (off vocal version)
 冷たい部屋、一人 (off vocal version)
 イグジスト (Exist)
 Release date: 11 February 2015
 イグジスト (Exist)
 暗夜航路 (Anya Kouro)
 イグジスト (off vocal version)
 暗夜航路 (off vocal version)
 騎士行進曲 (Kishikoushin Kyouku)
 Release date: 29 April 2015
 騎士行進曲 (Kishi Koushinkyouku)
 愛、ひと欠片 (Ai, Hito Kakera)
 騎士行進曲 (off vocal version)
 愛、ひと欠片 (off vocal version)
 DEAD OR ALIVE
 Release date: 11 November 2015
 DEAD OR ALIVE
 ホライズン (Horizon)
 DEAD OR ALIVE (off vocal version)
 ホライズン (off vocal version)
全力☆Summer! (Zenryoku☆Summer!)
Release date : 5 July 2017
 全力☆Summer! (Zenryoku☆Summer!)
 あんぢぇら音頭 (Angela Ondo)
 全力☆Summer! (off vocal version)
 あんぢぇら音頭 (off vocal version)
SURVIVE!
 Release date: 18 July 2018
 SURVIVE!
 KINGS (live version)
 To be with U! (live version)
 KIZUNA (live version) (M2,M3,M4 recorded from EX THEATER ROPPONGI event on 24 February 2018)
 SURVIVE! (off-vocal version)
THE BEYOND
 Release date: 22 May 2019
 THE BEYOND
 私はそこにいますか
 THE BEYOND (off-vocal version)
 私はそこにいますか (off-vocal version)
乙女のルートはひとつじゃない! (Otome no Route wa Hitotsu Janai!)
Release date: 22 April 2020
Artist Edition
 乙女のルートはひとつじゃない! (Otome no Route wa Hitotsu Janai!)
 Baby!! I'm lost!!
 乙女のルートはひとつじゃない! (off-vocal version)
 Baby!! I'm lost!! (off-vocal version)
 Anime Edition
 乙女のルートはひとつじゃない! (Otome no Route wa Hitotsu Janai!)
 Baby!! I'm lost!!
 乙女のルートはひとつじゃない! (TV size)
 乙女のルートはひとつじゃない! (off-vocal version)
 Baby!! I'm lost!! (off-vocal version)
叫べ (Sakebe)
Release date: 11 November 2020
 叫べ (Sakebe)
 おやすみ (Oyasumi)
 叫べ (off-vocal version)
 おやすみ (off-vocal version)
アンダンテに恋をして! (Andante ni Koi o Shite!)
Release date: 7 July 2021
 アンダンテに恋をして! (Andante ni Koi o Shite!)
 愛を謳う (Ai o Utau)
 アンダンテに恋をして! (off-vocal version)
 愛を謳う (off-vocal version)

Digital Singles
 バイバイオーライ (Bye Bye All Right)
 Release date: 27 December 2013
 バイバイオーライ (Bye Bye All Right)

Collaboration Singles
キラキラ-go-round (Kirakira-go-round) [as angela Presents/ Shoko Nakagawa]
Release date: 23 July 2014
僕は僕であって (Boku wa Boku de Atte) [as angela x fripSide]
Release date : 19 October 2016
 僕は僕であって (Boku wa Boku de Atte)
 僕は僕であって (TV size)
 僕は僕であって (off vocal version) 
The end of escape [as fripSide x angela]
Release date: 7 December 2016

Albums

Studio  / Original Albums
ソラノコエ (Sora no Koe)
Release date: 3 December 2003
Track list:
over the limits
明日へのbrilliant road (Asu e no brilliant road)
奇跡のring (Kiseki no ring)
Pain
dear my best friend
綺麗な夜空 (Kirei na Yozora)
幸せの温度 (Shiawase no Ondo)
カレイドスコープ (Kaleidoscope)
How many?
The end of the world
アイ・オー (I/O)
Release date: 17 November 2004
Track list:
CORE
謝罪状況 (Shazai Joukyou)
merry-go-round
笑い者のFairy tale (Waraimono no Fairy tale)
solitude
maybe..maybe..
feel, like a breeze
cheers!
小さな歴史の詩 (Chiisa na Rekishi no Uta)
on my way ~reborn~
Shangri-La
Separation (Piano version)
PRHYTHM
Release date: 15 March 2006
Track list:
Yell for you
未来とゆう名の答え (Mirai to Yuu Na no Kotae)
翼 (Tsubasa)
ラヴ・ランデヴー (Love Rendezvous)
DEAD SET
Decide
Forget everything
EMOTION
年下未知数脳内HD (Toshishita Michisuu Nounai HD)
果て無きモノローグ (Hatenaki Monologue)
Peace of mind
fly me to the sky
Land Ho!
Release date: 9 September 2009
Track list:
Galactic material
Spiral
Beautiful fighter
光、探せなくとも (Hikari, Sagase Nakutomo)
満月オールナイト (Mangetsu All Night)
SONGS
Fine!
此処に居るよ (Koko ni iru yo)
innocence
Beginning
My story
パノラマ (Panorama)
mirror☆ge
Release date: 22 June 2011
Track list:
蒼穹 (Soukyuu)
mirrorballs
オルタナティヴ (Alternative)
『リアル』は… ("Real" wa…)
理解と破壊へのプレリュード (Rikai to Hakai no Prelude)
ぐるぐる☆ぼし (Guruguru☆Boshi)
Catch and Go!
どんなに、、、どれくらい、、、 (Donnani, Dorekurai)
Wonderful World
FORTUNES
蒼い春 (Aoi Haru)
キラフワ (Kirafuwa)
ZERO
Release date: 24 April 2013
Oricon peak weekly chart position: 10
Track list:
KINGS
僕じゃない (Boku janai)
So sweet memories
Remember me
生命 -イノチ- (Seimei -Life-)
境界線Set me free (Kyoukai-sen Set me free)
THE LIGHTS OF HEROES
This is my wish
Always 好きだよ (Always Sukidayo)
いつかのゼロから (Itsuka no Zero Kara)
-レクイエム・オブ・レッド- (-Requiem of Red-)
To be with U
ONE WAY
Release date: 20 May 2015
Track list:
イグジスト (Exist)
Different colors
シドニア (Sidonia)
Sail away
キラキラ-go-round (Kira Kira-go-round)
春夏秋冬 (Shunkashuto)
This is Love
ANGEL
バイバイオーライ (Bye Bye All Right)
その時、蒼穹へ (Sono Toki, Soukyuu e)
二十四節気恋唄 (Nijushisekki Koi Uta)
騎士行進曲 (Kishi Koushinkyouku) [angela × HEAVENS WiRE Remix]
LOVE & CARNIVAL
Release date: 31 August 2016
Track list:
DEAD OR ALIVE
Come on
是、夏祭り (Ze, Natsu Matsuri)
騎士行進曲 (Kishi Koushinkyouku)
愛、ひと欠片 (Ai, Hito Kakera)
KIZUNA
愛すること (Aisuru Koto)
Jump up!
EIEIO
That's Halloween
ストーリーが始まる (Story ga Hajimaru)
ホライズン (Horizon)
Beyond
Release date: 20 December 2017
Track list:
僕は僕であって
全力☆Summer!
Dream on.flac
Prologue -君の向こう側-
語り継がれしもの
あの夏空
SEVEN STORIES
Beautiful day
道しるべ
Calling you
LOVE★CIRCUS

Compilation / Best Albums
宝箱 -TREASURE BOX- (Takarabako -TREASURE BOX-)
Release date: 12 December 2007
Track list:
DISC 1:
明日へのbrilliant road (Asu e no brilliant road)
綺麗な夜空 (Kirei na Yozora)
The end of the world
merry-go-round
Stay With Me
fly me to the sky
Proof
in your arms
Shangri-La
cheers!
DEAD SET
Yell for you
果て無きモノローグ (Hatenaki Monologue)
鳥 (Tori)
gravitation
DISC 2:
overture
恋のfirst run (Koi no first run)
涙が止まるまで (Namida ga Tomaru Made)
Tears on my pillow
LOVE LOVE Sweetie
君の傍で (Kimi no Soba de)
宝箱2 -TREASURE BOX II- (Takarabako 2 -TREASURE BOX II-)
Release date: 21 May 2014
Track list:
DISC 1:
Beautiful fighter
約束 (Yakusoku)
Spiral
Galactic Material
オルタナティヴ (Alternative)
蒼い春 (Aoi Haru)
FORTUNES
蒼穹 (Soukyuu)
かべ2 (Kabe 2)
キラフワ (Kirafuwa)
THE LIGHTS OF HEROES
KINGS
僕じゃない (Boku Janai)
over the limits
笑顔でバイバイ (Egao de Bye Bye)
DISC 2 -BALLADE COLLECTION-:
The end of the world
幸せの温度 (Shiawase no Ondo)
Proof
笑い者のFairy tale (Waraisha no Fairy tale)
Separation[pf]
果て無きモノローグ (Hatenaki Monologue)
Peace of mind
Darling
Link
へんじ (Henji)
Shangri-La[mf]
宝箱と宝箱2が入ったブルーレイで聞くやつ (Takarabako to Takarabako 2 ga Haitta Blu-ray de Kikuyatsu)
Release date: 21 May 2014
Track list:
明日へのbrilliant road (Asu e no brilliant road)
綺麗な夜空 (Kirei na Yozora)
The end of the world
merry-go-round
Stay With Me
fly me to the sky
Proof
in your arms
Shangri-La
cheers!
DEAD SET
Yell for you
果て無きモノローグ (Hatenaki Monologue)
鳥 (Tori)
gravitation
overture
恋のfirst run (Koi no first run)
涙が止まるまで (Namida ga Tomaru Made)
Tears on my pillow
LOVE LOVE Sweetie
君の傍で (Kimi no Soba de)
Beautiful fighter
約束 (Yakusoku)
Spiral
Galactic Material
オルタナティヴ (Alternative)
蒼い春 (Aoi Haru)
FORTUNES
蒼穹 (Soukyuu)
かべ2 (Kabe 2)
キラフワ (Kirafuwa)
THE LIGHTS OF HEROES
KINGS
僕じゃない (Boku Janai)
over the limits
笑顔でバイバイ (Egao de Bye Bye)
The end of the world
幸せの温度 (Shiawase no Ondo)
Proof
笑い者のFairy tale (Waraisha no Fairy tale)
Separation[pf]
果て無きモノローグ (Hatenaki Monologue)
Peace of mind
Darling
Link
へんじ (Henji)
Shangri-La[mf]
+off vocal versions of all above tracks

Mini albums
新宿狂詩曲(ラプソディー) (Shinjuku Rhapsody)
Release date: 6 December 2006
Track list:
接触 (Sesshoku)
人生遊戯 (Jinsei Yuugi)
僕の両手 (Boku no Ryoute)
鳥 (Tori)
独り (Hitori)
月の無い夜 (Tsuki no Nai Yoru)
移り気 (Utsurigi)
蒼穹のファフナー HEAVEN AND EARTH　イメージミニアルバム (Soukyuu no Fafner HEAVEN AND EARTH Image Mini Album)
Release date: 25 August 2010
Track list:
FORTUNES
理解と破壊のプレリュード (Rikai to hakai no Prelude)
fly me to the sky
Shangri-La
Separation
果て無きモノローグ (Hatenaki Monologue)
Peace of mind

Other albums
Wonderful World サントラアルバム (Wonderful World Soundtrack Album)
Release date: 14 July 2010
Track list:
THE LAST GAME
Time attack
The truth is...
Half and Half
Requiem 
Psychic Show
Clear Up
Question to me
DEATH GAME	
Each Other
Suspense
Mathematics
HEM 
Transformation
Patient
Execution Circuit 
Conviction
Un-Wonderful World
Wonderful World
夜が運ばれてくるまでに 〜A Song in A Bed〜 (Yoru ga Hakobarete Kuru Made ni 〜A Song in a Bed〜)
Release date: 19 January 2011
Track list:
「いんとろ」 (Intro)
「それがどこにあるか」 (Sore ga Doko ni Aru ka)
「うんめい」 (Unmei)
「あるはれたひに」 (Aru Hareta Hi ni)
「さくひん」 (Sakuhin)
「だいびんぐ」 (Diving)
「へんじ」 (Henji)
「かべ2」 (Kabe 2)
夜が運ばれてくるまでに（読書用BGM） (Yoru ga Hakobarete Kuru Made ni (Dokusho-yō BGM))

Music Video Collections
 宝島 -TREASURE ISLAND- (Takarajima -TREASURE ISLAND-)
 Release date: 26 December 2007
明日へのbrilliant road (Asu e no Brilliant Road)
over the limits
merry-go-round
fly me to the sky
Shangri-La
DEAD SET
Peace of mind
gravitation
 宝島 -TREASURE ISLAND- II (Takarajima -TREASURE ISLAND- II)
 Release date: 1 August 2012
Beautiful fighter
Spiral
 オルタナティヴ (Alternative)
蒼い春 (Aoi Haru)
『リアル』は・・ ("Real" wa..)
蒼穹 (Soukyuu)
THE LIGHTS OF HEROES
 angela TREASURE Blu-ray BOX
 Release date: 29 January 2014
明日へのbrilliant road (Asu e no Brilliant Road)
over the limits
merry-go-round
fly me to the sky
Shangri-La
DEAD SET
Peace of mind
gravitation
Beautiful fighter
Spiral
 オルタナティヴ (Alternative)
蒼い春 (Aoi Haru)
『リアル』は・・ ("Real" wa..)
蒼穹 (Soukyuu)
THE LIGHTS OF HEROES
KINGS
僕じゃない (Boku Janai)
ANGEL
Untitled

Tie-in

References

External links
 StarChild's Official angela
 Style Market's Official angela
 angela's Official YouTube Channel
 J-Music Ignited | angela

Japanese pop music groups
King Records (Japan) artists
Musical groups from Tokyo
Anime musical groups